Baldeep Singh (born 17 August 1982) is an Indian footballer who plays for Air India as a defender in I-League. He is often referred to as "Baldeep Singh Senior" to avoid confusion with another former JCT player Baldeep Singh "Junior".

Career

Air India
Singh made his debut for Air India F.C. on 20 September 2012 during a Federation Cup match against Mohammedan at the Kanchenjunga Stadium in Siliguri, West Bengal in which he started the match; Air India lost the match 0–1.

Career statistics

Club
Statistics accurate as of 12 May 2013

References

Indian footballers
1987 births
Living people
Salgaocar FC players
United Sikkim F.C. players
Air India FC players
Footballers from Punjab, India
Association football defenders